Torsåker parish may refer to:

Torsåker Parish, Diocese of Härnösand, parish in Diocese of Härnösand
Torsåker Parish, Diocese of Strängnäs, former parish in Diocese of Strängnäs
Torsåker Parish, Diocese of Uppsala, parish in Diocese of Uppsala